The Raut Cabinet is the Council of Ministers headed by Mohammad Lalbabu Raut in Madhesh Province, Nepal. Mohammad Lalbabu Raut from Federal Socialist Forum, Nepal was sworn in the Chief Ministers of Madhesh Province in February 2018.  Present arrangement of cabinet is the result of talk between two Former Deputy Prime Ministers,  PSP-N President Upendra Yadav and Nepali Congress  Vice-president Bimalendra Nidhi who have strong hold in this region from their respective parties.

This is a brief list of minister since 9 June 2021 since when PSP-N and Nepali Congress are two major parties in government.

Current arrangement

Ministers by Party

Since 2021

Till 2021

Previous arrangements

Chief Minister & Cabinet Ministers

State Ministers

See also 
Lalbabu Raut
 Mahendra Narayan Nidhi Awas Yojana
 Krishna Chandra Nepali cabinet
 Kul Prasad KC cabinet
 Jeevan Bahadur Shahi cabinet
 Trilochan Bhatta cabinet

References

External links
 Province No.2 official website
 Cabinet of Province No. 2

Government of Madhesh Province
Provincial cabinets of Nepal
History of Madhesh Province
2018 establishments in Nepal